Wyse Jackson may refer to 

 John Wyse Jackson, Irish author 
Patrick Wyse Jackson (born 1960), Irish geologist 
Peter Wyse Jackson (born 1955), Irish botanist 
Robert Wyse Jackson (1908–1976), Irish bishop and author